Phyllonorycter gemmea is a moth of the family Gracillariidae. It is known from Massachusetts and Maine in the United States.

The wingspan is 7-7.5 mm.

The larvae feed on Robinia species, including Robinia pseudacacia. They mine the leaves of their host plant. The mine has the form of a blotch mine on the upperside of the leaf.

References

gemmea
Moths of North America
Moths described in 1873